Darryn Gallagher (born 24 April 1977) is a South African field hockey player who competed in the 2008 Summer Olympics.  He was the head of hockey at Northwood Boys High School before moving to Hilton College where he is now the Director of Sport.

References

External links
 

1977 births
Living people
South African people of Irish descent
South African male field hockey players
Field hockey players at the 2006 Commonwealth Games
Commonwealth Games competitors for South Africa
Olympic field hockey players of South Africa
Field hockey players at the 2008 Summer Olympics
21st-century South African people